The 1934 Missouri Tigers football team was an American football team that represented the University of Missouri in the Big Six Conference (Big 6) during the 1934 college football season. The team compiled a 0–8–1 record (0–5 against Big 6 opponents), finished in sixth place in the Big 6, and was outscored by all opponents by a combined total of 172 to 25. Frank Carideo was the head coach for the third of three seasons. The team played its home games at Memorial Stadium in Columbia, Missouri.

The team's leading scorer was Harold Bourne with 13 points.

Schedule

References

Missouri
Missouri Tigers football seasons
Missouri Tigers football